Roger de Mowbray may refer to:

 Roger de Mowbray (died 1188) (–1188), Anglo-Norman magnate
 Roger de Mowbray (d. ), younger brother of William de Mowbray
 Roger de Mowbray (–1266), son of William de Mowbray
 Roger de Mowbray, 1st Baron Mowbray (died 1297), English peer and soldier
 Roger de Mowbray (Scottish sheriff), 13th century noble
 Roger de Mowbray (died 1320), Scottish noble, tried for treason against King Robert I of Scotland